The third season of Gilmore Girls, an American dramedy television series, began airing on September 24, 2002 on The WB. The season concluded on May 20, 2003, after 22 episodes. The season was aired on Tuesday nights at 8/7c.

On March 25, 2003, The WB announced that the show was renewed for a fourth season.

Overview
Lorelai has to break the news to Richard and Emily that she and Christopher aren't getting back together, although this does result in her mending her rift with Luke. Rory is estranged from Christopher for a time but later gets back in touch, resulting in the girls attending Sherry's baby shower and supporting her in labor until Christopher arrives. Lorelai has trouble getting back into dating, receiving a dinner invite from Kirk, intermittently dating Alex (the business partner of an old friend of Sookie's), and having a brief reunion with Max.

Rory tries to forget about her kiss with Jess by throwing herself into her relationship with Dean, but Dean breaks up with her when she spends a dance marathon obsessing over Jess and his girlfriend, Shane. Rory and Jess begin dating, but Rory finds Jess isn't as attentive or reliable as Dean was. Dean starts dating one of her old classmates, Lindsay Lister, and they become engaged. Jess takes a job at Wal-Mart to buy a car and skips class to take extra shifts. He is told he hasn't done enough to graduate and, as a result, can't take Rory to the prom. He acts out by trying to pressure Rory in to having sex, and engages in a fist fighting with Dean. After a visit from his estranged father, Jimmy, Jess leaves town without telling Luke or Rory. He reconnects with Jimmy in California.

Lane finds a band to be drummer with and Lorelai and Rory let them practice in the garage. Lane starts dating bandmate Dave Rygalski in secret, using her mother's preferred prom date Young Chui as cover. Things become complicated when Yung Chui stupidly falls in love with Lane, and Dave won't be able to take Lane to the prom because her mother doesn't approve. Lane gets drunk at a party, eargerly calls her mother and tells her everything. Dave pleads their case and Mrs. Kim lets them go to the prom together, but still grounds Lane afterwards. Paris starts dating Jamie, a student from Princeton that she and Rory met in Washington D.C., but falls out with Rory when she thinks Rory told student council rival Francie about her and Jamie. However, it's Rory that Paris turns to when she sleeps with Jamie, fails to get into Harvard, and ultimately has a nervous breakdown. Luke rents the premises next to the diner to Taylor, who plans to open a soda shop. Luke ends up dating Taylor's solicitor, Nicole Leahy.

Richard takes Lorelai and Rory on a trip to Yale, where he has secretly set up an interview for Rory. Lorelai is incensed, especially when Rory makes Yale one of her backup applications, but they both realize it is where Rory really wants to go. Richard gives Lorelai $75,000 from an investment he made when she was born and she uses it to pay her parents back for Rory's school fees. Emily interprets this as Lorelai cutting ties with them and there is a falling out. Richard's financial gift results in Rory being refused financial aid.

The Independence Inn is gutted by a fire and Lorelai, Sookie and Michel struggle to keep it open as a B&B. Lorelai and Sookie renew plans to buy the Dragonfly Inn after Fran dies. Sookie discovers she is pregnant. Independence Inn closes and Lorelai is unable to afford Dragonfly since she needs to pay Rory's university fees. Rory borrows the money from Richard and Emily in return for reinstating Friday night dinners.

Lorelai and Rory are planning to go backpacking in Europe while Luke is planning to go on a cruise with Nicole. Lorelai and Sookie are able to buy the Dragonfly now that Lorelai doesn't have to pay for Yale. Rory gives the valedictorian's speech at graduation, paying tribute to her grandparents and Lorelai, and the season ends with Rory and Lorelai looking around Chilton for the last time.

Cast

Main cast
 Lauren Graham as Lorelai Gilmore, Rory's mother.
 Alexis Bledel as Rory Gilmore, Lorelai's daughter.
 Melissa McCarthy as Sookie St. James, Lorelai's best friend and co-worker.
 Keiko Agena as Lane Kim, Rory's best friend.
 Yanic Truesdale as Michel Gerard, Lorelai and Sookie's co-worker.
 Scott Patterson as Luke Danes, the owner of the local diner.
 Liza Weil as Paris Geller, Rory's classmate and good friend.
 Jared Padalecki as Dean Forester, Rory's ex-boyfriend.
 Milo Ventimiglia as Jess Mariano, Luke's nephew and Rory's boyfriend.
 Sean Gunn as Kirk Gleason, a resident of Stars Hollow who works a lot of jobs.
 Kelly Bishop as Emily Gilmore, Lorelai's mother and Rory's grandmother.
 Edward Herrmann as Richard Gilmore, Lorelai's father and Rory's grandfather.

Recurring cast
 Teal Redmann as Louise Grant, Paris's best friend.
 Shelly Cole as Madeline Lynn, Paris's best friend.
 Liz Torres as Miss Patty, the owner of the local dance studio.
 Jackson Douglas as Jackson Belleville, Sookie's husband.
 Adam Brody as Dave Rygalski, Lane's boyfriend and bandmate.
 Emily Kuroda as Mrs. Kim, Lane's religious mother.
 Michael Winters as Taylor Doose, the owner of the local grocery store.
 Sally Struthers as Babette Dell, Lorelai and Rory's nextdoor neighbor.
 Scott Cohen as Max Medina, Lorelai's ex-fiance.
 Todd Lowe as Zack Van Gerbig, Lane's bandmate.
 John Cabrera as Brian Fuller, Lane's bandmate.
 Dakin Matthews as Headmaster Hanlin Charleston, the principal of Chilton.
 Tricia O'Kelley as Nicole Leahy, Luke's girlfriend.
 Biff Yeager as Tom, a resident of Stars Hollow.
 Emily Bergl as Francie Jarvis, Rory's classmate and nemesis.
 Arielle Kebbel as Lindsay Lister, Dean's girlfriend.
 Rose Abdoo as Gypsy, the owner of the local auto shop.
 Mädchen Amick as Sherry Tinsdale, Christopher's fiance.
 Alan Blumenfeld as Rabbi David Barans, a rabbi at the local synagogue.
 Mike Gandolfi as Andrew, the owner of the local bookstore.
 Jim Jansen as Reverend Archie Skinner, a priest at the local church.
 Grant Lee Phillips as Grant, the town troubadour.
 Ted Rooney as Morey Dell, Babette's husband and Rory and Lorelai's nextdoor neighbor.
 Aris Alvarado as Caesar, an employee at Luke's diner.
 Adam Wylie as Brad Langford, Rory's classmate and good friend.

Guest
 Marion Ross as Lorelai 'Trix' Gilmore the First, Richard's mother, Lorelai's grandmother, and Rory's great-grandmother.
 David Sutcliffe as Christopher Hayden, Rory's father and Lorelai's ex-boyfriend.
 Scout Taylor Compton as Clara Forester, Dean's younger sister.

Episodes

Filming 
Scenes at Yale University in episode 8 were actually filmed on the campus of Pomona College.

DVD release

References

Season
2002 American television seasons
2003 American television seasons